Maximilian Funke-Kaiser (born 17 August 1993) is a German politician for the FDP. He was elected a member of the Bundestag from Bavaria in the 2021 German federal election.

Life and politics 

Funke-Kaiser was born in 1993 in Augsburg and graduated from the University of Augsburg. He was elected to the Bundestag in 2021.

References 

Living people
1993 births
Politicians from Augsburg
Free Democratic Party (Germany) politicians
Members of the Bundestag 2021–2025
21st-century German politicians
University of Augsburg alumni

Members of the Bundestag for Bavaria